Bonnie & Clyde is a revisionist 2013 miniseries about Great Depression-era outlaws Bonnie Parker and Clyde Barrow starring Emile Hirsch as Clyde Barrow and Holliday Grainger as Bonnie Parker. The two-part series aired on consecutive nights, December 8 and 9, 2013, simultaneously on A&E, History, and Lifetime (all owned by A&E Networks). The first previews were released on September 23, 2013. The series was widely criticized for its historical inaccuracies, particularly as it was aired on History.

Plot 
The two-part television series is based on the true story of Clyde Barrow and Bonnie Parker.  Barrow, a charismatic convicted armed robber, sweeps Parker – a young and impressionable, petite, small-town waitress, who is already married – off her feet. In the early 1930s, the two embark on one of the most infamous crime sprees in American history.

Part 1: Tells the story of Clyde Barrow's childhood growing up in rural Texas with his older brother Buck as they steal chickens, and later they do a stint in prison for stealing bigger and better things. After Buck ends up incarcerated again, Clyde meets the love of his life Bonnie Parker, who dreams of becoming a movie star in Hollywood. Soon the couple goes on a crime spree, robbing banks together after Clyde's partner is caught. They are able to stay one step ahead of the "laws" while they rob bigger banks in the state.

Part 2: Clyde asks his newlywed brother Buck to help them. Not wanting to be alone at home, his wife Blanche becomes the fourth member of the Barrow Gang. However, Bonnie pushes Clyde to commit more dangerous crimes and rob banks across the state line to generate headlines in the newspapers, and their life of crime soon leads to their deaths.

Cast 
 Emile Hirsch as Clyde Barrow, bank robber and getaway driver
 Holliday Grainger as Bonnie Parker, married waitress turned bank robber
 Lane Garrison as Marvin "Buck" Barrow, Clyde's older brother 
 Sarah Hyland as Blanche Barrow, Buck's young wife who is a member of the Barrow Gang
 Holly Hunter as Emma Parker, Bonnie's mother
 William Hurt as Frank Hamer, retired Texas Ranger called out of retirement to track down and capture Bonnie and Clyde
 Austin Hebert as Ted Hinton, Dallas County, Texas, Deputy Sheriff and posse member of Bonnie and Clyde's capture
 Elizabeth Reaser as P.J. Lane, The Herald newspaper reporter who wrote about Bonnie and Clyde's crime spree
 Desomnd Phillips as Ray Hamilton, bank robber and first member of Bonnie and Clyde's gang
 Aaron Jay Rome as Ralph Fults, outlaw and escape artist of the Barrow Gang
 Garrett Kruithof as Henry Methvin, bank robber and last member of the Barrow Gang
 Jonathan Vane as Captain Harley Grace

Reception

Ratings 
Part 1 of Bonnie & Clyde delivered 9.8 million total viewers simulcast on three networks. This is cable's best miniseries opening in ratings since 2006's Broken Trail, outside of History's Hatfields & McCoys and The Bible.
A&E Networks closed out its two-part miniseries with 7.4 million viewers.

Awards
 Nominated – Critics' Choice Television Award for Best Miniseries
 Nominated – Critics' Choice Television Award for Best Actress in a Movie/Miniseries: Holliday Grainger
 Nominated – Satellite Award for Best Actress – Miniseries or Television Film: Holliday Grainger
 Nominated – Satellite Award for Best Supporting Actor – Series, Miniseries or Television Film: William Hurt
 Nominated – Primetime Emmy Award for Outstanding Miniseries
 Nominated – Primetime Emmy Award for Outstanding Hairstyling for a Miniseries or Movie
 Nominated – Primetime Emmy Award for Outstanding Makeup for a Miniseries or Movie (Non-Prosthetic)
 Nominated – Primetime Emmy Award for Outstanding Sound Editing for a Miniseries, Movie, or Special

See also 
 Barrow Gang
 Hybristophilia

References

External links 
 
 Bonnie & Clyde (History Channel)
 Bonnie & Clyde (A&E)

2013 American television series debuts
2010s American television miniseries
American biographical series
Cultural depictions of Bonnie and Clyde
Great Depression television series
Television series about the Texas Ranger Division